Donje Grgure is a village in the municipality of Blace, Serbia. According to the 2002 census, the village has a population of 127  people.

References

Populated places in Toplica District